Michael or Mike Pearson may refer to:

Lester B. Pearson (1897–1972), known as Mike Pearson, 14th Prime Minister of Canada
Michael Pearson (horologist) (born 1936), English author on the subject of clocks
Michael Pearson (historian) (born 1941), historian of Indian Ocean
Michael Pearson (author) (born 1949), American novelist
Michael Pearson, 4th Viscount Cowdray (born 1944), landowner
Mike Parker Pearson (born 1957), British archaeologist
J. Michael Pearson (born 1960), CEO of Valeant Pharmaceuticals International
Mike Pearson (gridiron football) (born 1980), Canadian football player
Mike Pearson (footballer) (born 1988), Welsh association footballer

See also
Mike Parson (born 1955), Governor of Missouri since 2018
Mike Person (born 1988), American football player